Abu Dhabi Equestrian Club is a racecourse for flat racing located in Abu Dhabi.

History
The President of Abu Dhabi, Zayed bin Sultan Al Nahyan founded a riding club in 1976 and had a grass track for private racing of Arab horses laid down in 1980. Public racing began in 1991 and the track was expanded and modernised three years later. In 2011 a new grandstand was opened, providing seating for 5000 spectators.

Description
Abu Dhabi Equestrian Club has a 2000-metre right-handed grass track with a 400-metre straight. The course also has a synthetic fibresand training track.

Major races

Group 3

Listed races

External links 

 Official website

References

Horse racing venues in the United Arab Emirates
Sports venues completed in 1991
Sports venues in Abu Dhabi
1991 establishments in the United Arab Emirates